Tell Your Friends may refer to:

Tell Your Friends (Mary Prankster album), 2002
Tell Your Friends (Snarky Puppy album), 2010
"Tell Your Friends" (The Weeknd song), 2015
Tell Your Friends, debut EP by Dark Stares, 2012